Danforth is a surname. Notable people with the surname include:

 Asa Danforth (1746–1818), American highway engineer of the Revolutionary War era
 Asa Danforth Jr. (1768–1821), Upper Canada highway engineer
 Charles Haskell Danforth (1833–1969), American comparative anatomist
 Dave Danforth (1890–1970), American professional baseball player
 Elizabeth Danforth, creator in the role-playing game and video game industry
 Elliott Danforth, New York State Treasurer 1890–1893
 Emily M. Danforth (born 1980), US author
 George F. Danforth (1819–1899), New York judge
 Harold Warren Danforth (1916–1993), Member of the Parliament of Canada
 John Danforth (born 1936), 27th United States Ambassador to the United Nations
 Justin Danforth (born 1993), professional ice hockey player
 Loring Danforth, anthropology professor at Bates College in Lewiston, Maine
 Samuel Danforth (1626–1674), Puritan minister
 Thomas Danforth (1622–1699), a judge in the Salem witch trials
 Walter R. Danforth (1787–1861), journalist and 4th mayor of Providence, Rhode Island.
 William H. Danforth (1870–1955), founder of Ralston-Purina
 William Henry Danforth, M.D. (1926–2020), American physician and educator; Chancellor Emeritus of Washington University in St. Louis and Chairman of the Board of Trustees at Donald Danforth Plant Science Center

Fictional characters:
 Chad Danforth, character from the movie High School Musical, played by Corbin Bleu
Danforth, minor character in H.P. Lovecraft's novelette At the Mountains of Madness